Ostrovnoye (Ypaḷgyn) is a rural locality (a selo) in Bilibinsky District of Chukotka Autonomous Okrug, Russia, located on the banks of the Maly Anyuy River about  upstream from Anyuysk and about  from the administrative center of the district, Bilibino and  from Anadyr. Population: 379 (2010 est.), of which 317 were indigenous peoples. Population:  Municipally, Ostrovnoye is subordinated to Bilibinsky Municipal District and is incorporated as Ostrovnoye Rural Settlement.

History
Ostrovnoye is a historical locality in the region, as it was the site of an ostrog built as Russians began to explore and lay claim to the region, and was the site of trade fairs between Russians and natives. The ruins of the Ostrog are still visible not far from the village.  Since the beginning of the 18th century Russian explorers began active exploration of Kolyma and Chukotka, and the settlements they established were essentially fortresses, among them Anyuysky Ostrog, where the Anyuysk Fair was held, the largest in Chutkotka. The Ostrog was situated on an island in the Lesser Anyuy. However, because of constant spring flooding of the river the fair was repeatedly postponed until 1848 after a flood, which destroyed most of the island and the Ostrog itself, the settlement was moved to the left bank, 10 km downstream. However, the locals traditionally called this fortress "Island" and so that was the name that was assigned to the modern village, standing on the site of the former Ostrog.

In December 1930, the National district of Chukotka was established, consisting of Anadyrsky, Chukotsky (Чукотский), Markovsky (Марковский), Chaunsky (Чаунский), Eastern Tundra (Восточной Тундры, which was to become Bilibinsky District) and Western Tundra (Западной тундры) districts. Ostrovnoye was appointed as the first administrative centre of the new Eastern Tundra district with authority over six separate selsoviets, namely: Greater Yenyuisky, Lesser Yenyuisky (Мало-Энюйский), Oloysky (Олойский), Oloychansky (Олойчанский), Ostrovnovsky (Островновский) and Pogyndinsky (Погындинский).

The village was the site of the first Chukchi collective farm, "Turvaurgyn" (literally "New Life" in Chukchi), which was later reorganised into a farm called Ostrovnoye. By 1934, the village was equipped with a hospital, bakery and radio transmitter.

Demographics
Based on a 2006 estimate, the population of Ostrovnoye was 420, of which 340 were indigenous peoples. This is an increase from the 2005 population of 355 according to an environmental impact report on the Kupol Gold Project.

The population as of the beginning of January 2012 was 379, mainly Chukchi, representing a slight reduction on the 2010 official census record, of whom 183 were male and 201 female.

As of January 2012, the ethnic make up of the village was as following:

The head of the village is Yuri Vasilyevich Snitko.

Climate
Ostrovnoye has a subarctic climate (Koppen Dfc) with very cold, dry winters, and very mild, somewhat wetter summers.

See also
List of inhabited localities in Bilibinsky District

References

Notes

Sources
Bema Gold Corporation, Environmental Impact Assessment, Kupol Gold Project, Far East Russia June 2005
Dallmann, W.K. Indigenous Peoples of the north of the Russian Federation, Map 3.6, Chukotskiy Avtonomyy Okrug. 1997.

Strogoff, M, Brochet, P-C and Auzias, D. Petit Futé: Chukotka, "Avant-Garde" Publishing House, 2006.

Rural localities in Chukotka Autonomous Okrug
Populated places of Arctic Russia